The 2008 U.S. Figure Skating Championships took place between January 20 and 27th at the Xcel Energy Center in Saint Paul, Minnesota. Skaters competed in four disciplines – men's singles, ladies' singles, pair skating, and ice dancing – across three levels of competition – senior, junior, and novice. Medals were awarded in four colors: gold (first), silver (second), bronze (third), and pewter (fourth).

The event was used to determine the U.S. teams for the 2008 World Championships, 2008 Four Continents Championships, and 2008 World Junior Championships.

Competition notes
 Reigning four-time ice dancing silver medalists Melissa Gregory / Denis Petukhov withdrew before the event due to injury.
 Reigning silver medalist single skater Emily Hughes withdrew before the event due to injury.
 Ladies gold medalist Mirai Nagasu, silver medalist Rachael Flatt, and pewter medalist Caroline Zhang were not placed on the World or Four Continents team because they were not age-eligible.
 Evan Lysacek and Johnny Weir tied in the overall score, with Weir winning the short program and Lysacek winning the free skating. Lysacek won the title on the first tiebreak under International Skating Union rules, which was the free skating score.

Qualifying
Qualification for the U.S. Championships begins at one of nine regional competitions. The regions are New England, North Atlantic, South Atlantic, Upper Great Lakes, Eastern Great Lakes, Southwestern, Northwest Pacific, Central Pacific, and Southwest Pacific. The top four finishers in each regional advance to one of three sectional competitions (Eastern, Midwestern, and Pacific Coast). Skaters who place in the top four at sectionals advance to the U.S. Championships.

The top five finishers in each discipline from the previous year are given byes to the U.S. Championships, as are any skaters who qualify for the Junior or the Senior Grand Prix Final. Skaters are also given byes through a qualifying competition if they are assigned to an international event during the time that qualifying event is to take place. For example, if a skater is competing at an event at the same time as his or her regional competition, that skater would receive a bye to sectionals. If a skater is competing at an event at the same time as his or her sectional competition, that skater would qualify for the national event without having had to compete at a sectional championship.

Senior results

Men

* Weir and Lysacek tied in the overall score. Lysacek won the title on the tiebreaker, which was the free skating placement.

Ladies

Pairs

Ice dancing

Junior results

Men

Ladies

Pairs

Ice dancing

Novice results

Men

Ladies

Pairs

Ice dancing

International team selections

World Championships

Four Continents Championships

World Junior Championships

References

Sources
 U.S. Figure Skating Announces World, Four Continents and World Junior Teams

External links
 
 Saint Paul 2008 Figure Skating Championships

Sports in Minneapolis–Saint Paul
United States Figure Skating Championships
U.S. Figure Skating Championships
United States Figure Skating Championships, 2008
January 2008 sports events in the United States